The Santa Barbara Pastoral Region is a pastoral region of the Archdiocese of Los Angeles in the Roman Catholic Church.  It covers Santa Barbara and Ventura counties in the State of California, an area with a population in excess of 1.2 million. The region has 37 parishes, six high schools, 18 elementary schools, four hospitals, and four Spanish missions, including Mission Santa Barbara and Mission San Buenaventura. The region was created in 1986 as part of a plan by Los Angeles Archbishop Roger Mahony to make church leaders more accessible by dividing the sprawling Los Angeles Archdiocese into five pastoral regions.

The Santa Barbara Pastoral Region has been governed by three bishops since its foundation. The first was Patrick Ziemann, who served from 1986 until 1992, and later became involved in sexual and financial scandals. He was followed by Thomas J. Curry who ordained as the region's bishop in 1994, stepping down from the post in 2013 amid allegations that concealed sexual crimes perpetrated by other priests. The third is Robert E. Barron who held the position from 2015 to July, 2022.

Parishes

Deanery I (Lompoc, Solvang, Santa Maria, Guadalupe)

Deanery II (Santa Barbara, Goleta, Montecito and Carpinteria)

Deanery III (Oxnard, Ventura, Ojai, Fillmore, Santa Paula)

Deanery IV (Simi Valley, Westlake Village, Thousand Oaks, Moorpark, Camarillo)

Spanish missions
 Mission La Purisima Concepcion
 Mission Santa Ines
 Mission Santa Barbara
 Mission San Buenaventura

Universities, Colleges and Novitiates
 St. John's Seminary, Camarillo
 Thomas Aquinas College, Santa Paula
 San Lorenzo OFM, Capuchin Novitiate, Santa Ynez
 Santa Barbara Mission OFM Interprovincial Novitiate, Santa Barbara
 Dom Grea House, Canons of the Immaculate Conception (CRIC) Novitiate, Santa Paula

High schools
 Bishop Garcia Diego High School, Santa Barbara
 La Reina High School, Thousand Oaks
 St. Bonaventure High School, Ventura
 St. Joseph High School, Santa Maria
 Santa Clara High School, Oxnard
 Villanova Preparatory School, Ojai

Elementary schools
 Holy Cross School, Ventura
 La Purisima Concepcion School, Lompoc
 Notre Dame School, Santa Barbara
 Our Lady of the Assumption School, Ventura
 Our Lady of Guadalupe School, Oxnard
 Our Lady of Mount Carmel School, Montecito
 Sacred Heart School, Ventura
 St. Anthony School, Oxnard
 St. Jude the Apostle School, Westlake Village
 St. Mary of the Assumption School, Santa Maria
 St. Louis de Montfort School, Santa Maria
 St. Mary Magdalen School, Camarillo
 St. Paschal Baylon School, Thousand Oaks
 St. Raphael School, Goleta
 St. Rose of Lima School, Simi Valley
 St. Sebastian School, Santa Paula
 Santa Clara School, Oxnard

Hospitals
 Marian Regional Medical Center, Santa Maria, California
 St. John's Pleasant Valley Hospital, Camarillo
 St. John's Regional Medical Center, Oxnard

Cemeteries
 Assumption Cemetery, Simi Valley
 Santa Clara Cemetery, Oxnard
 Calvary Cemetery, Santa Barbara
 Mission Santa Barbara Mausoleum, Santa Barbara

See also
Roman Catholic Archdiocese of Los Angeles
 Our Lady of the Angels Pastoral Region
 San Fernando Pastoral Region
 San Gabriel Pastoral Region
 San Pedro Pastoral Region
List of schools in the Roman Catholic Archdiocese of Los Angeles

References

External links
  Roman Catholic Archdiocese of Los Angeles

Roman Catholic Archdiocese of Los Angeles
Los Angeles Santa Barbara